William Houghton may refer to:
 William Houghton (bishop) (died 1298), Roman Catholic Archbishop of Dublin, Ireland
 William Houghton (naturalist) (1828–1895), author of British Fresh-Water Fishes (1879)
 William Houghton (American football) (1908–2001), American football coach
 William Henry Houghton (1887–1947), president of the Moody Bible Institute
 William Stanley Houghton (1881-1913), British playwright
 William Vasey Houghton (1921–2001), Australian politician
 William Houghton (cricketer) (born 1955), Zimbabwean cricketer